Musaifiyah is a village located on Al-Jabal Al-Akhdar (the Green Mountain) in Oman.  It is located to the north of the City of Nizwa.

Populated places in Oman
Ad Dakhiliyah Governorate